The Tupolev I-12 (also known as the ANT-23) was a prototype Soviet fighter aircraft that never reached production. The I-12 was of unconventional design with twin booms made of water pipes containing recoilless rifles and two engines in a push-pull configuration. The aircraft first flew in 1931 but did not enter production due to disappointing performance and operational difficulties such as the inability for the pilot to escape the aircraft without hitting the propeller arc behind him. The second prototype from Tupolev (designated ANT-23bis) was never completed.

Specifications

References

External links
Airwar (in Russian)
Tupolev

1930s Soviet fighter aircraft
I-12
Twin-engined push-pull aircraft
Aircraft first flown in 1931